Madison Welch (born 27 August 1988) is an English former glamour model and Page 3 girl. She has made several appearances in lads mags such as Zoo Weekly.

She made an appearance on an episode of BBC's Top Gear in 2009 as James May's co-driver in a classic car rally and has also featured in comedy sketches on Russell Howard's Good News.

In 2011, Welch appeared as a "Forest Woman" in the Danny McBride fantasy film Your Highness.

See also

The Sun (United Kingdom)
Lad culture

References 

1989 births
Glamour models
Living people
Page 3 girls